Rain scald (also known as dermatophilosis, tufailosis, rain rot or streptothricosis) is a dermatological disease affecting cattle and horses. Once in the skin, the bacterium Dermatophilus congolensis causes inflammation of the skin as well as the appearance of scabs and lesions.

Symptoms and signs
There are two different manifestations of rain scald: the winter form, which is more severe due to the longer coat of the horse, and the summer form, which is less severe. Horses are usually affected on the back, head, and neck where insects commonly bite, and the legs, which are commonly infected if the horse is kept in moist footing. Initially, the horse will display a matted coat and bumps which will progress to crusty scabs and lesions. The animal may also be pruritic and display signs of discomfort.

Diagnosis
Diagnosis is most commonly done with the identification of bacteria in the lesions by microscopic evaluation. A positive diagnosis of rain scald can be confirmed if filamentous bacteria are observed, as well as chains of small, spherical bacteria (cocci). If a diagnosis cannot be confirmed with a microscope, blood agar cultures can be grown to confirm the presence of D. congolensis. The resulting colonies have filaments and are yellow in colour.

Prevention
In addition to wet conditions, exposure to ticks, biting flies, and contact with other infected animals can also cause the spread of rain scald. Tick and insect control is an effective way to stop the spread of the bacteria from one animal to another. Separating infected animals will help to isolate bacterial colonies. Keeping the animal in a dry, well-ventilated area out of the rain and wet conditions will stop the bacteria from growing. As the bacteria multiplies best in warm, wet conditions, keeping the horse stabled, sheltered, or rugged with a waterproof rug during wet weather, protects the skin from prolonged wetting and helps to prevent infection.

Treatment
Rain scald normally heals on its own; however, the condition can spread, so prompt treatment is recommended. Although some cases can be severe, most rain scald is minor and can be treated at home naturally.

Treatment involves cleaning affected areas with antiseptic scrub and applying a solution of 1% potash alum. Affected areas should be gently washed with a mild disinfectant shampoo or solution like chlorhexidine or povidone iodine. A broad-spectrum antibiotic powder, spray or ointment is applied. Severely affected horses may need systemic antibiotic treatment by injection or by mouth.

Typically the condition is not life-threatening, nor does it impact the welfare of the horse, so treatments are more for the owner's peace of mind and cosmetic appeal of the animal.

References

Horse diseases
Bacterium-related cutaneous conditions
Bovine diseases